Mina Urgan (14 May 1916 – 15 June 2000) was a Turkish academic, translator, author and socialist politician.

Early life
Mina Urgan was born to poet Tahsin Nahit and his wife Şefika in İstanbul on 14 May 1916. To another source, she was born on 1 May 1915. Her father died as she was three years old, and her mother made a second marriage with Falih Rıfkı Atay, a renowned journalist and writer. As the Surname Law was enacted in Turkey in 1934, her stepfather's close friend, the renowned author Necip Fazıl Kısakürek, suggested her the family name Urgan (literally "rope"), ironically stating that "it would match her because the socialist-minded young girl would be hanged one day anyway".

She was inspired by her stepfather Atay and enjoyed to be in his circle of people of letters and artists. She was one of the first female skiers and swimmers in Turkey. She graduated from Istanbul University studying French Philology. After doctorate studies in English literature, she continued her post-doctoral studies in the same university's School of English Philology. In 1949, she became an associate professor with her thesis "Harlequins in the era of Elizabeth I of England theater". She was appointed professor at the same faculty in 1960. She retired in 1977.

Writing career
She translated works of Thomas Malory (c. 1415–18 – 1471), Henry Fielding (1707–1754), Honoré de Balzac (1799–1850), Aldous Huxley (1894–1963), Graham Greene (1904–1991), William Golding (1911–1993), John Galsworthy (1867–1933) and Shakespeare (1564–1616) into Turkish. Urgan gained fame with her autobiography Bir Dinozorun Anıları ("Memoirs of a Dinosaur"). The 1998 published book remained several weeks on the best seller list. Upon this success, she wrote another autobiography Bir Dinozorun Gezileri ("Travels of a Dinosaur"), which was published in 1999.

In politics
Urgan entered politics in 1960. She was one of the charter members of the Workers Party of Turkey (TİP) and the Freedom and Solidarity Party (ÖDP). In the 1999 general elections, she ran for a seat in the parliament from the ÖDP. However, she did not reach her goal because her party failed to exceed the 10 percent threshold for parliamentary representation.

Private life
Urgan was married to poet and actor Cahit Irgat (1916–1971). The couple were divorced later. She was mother of a son Mustafa Irgat (1950–1995), a poet and painter, and a daughter Zeynep Irgat, an actress. She died at the age of 84 in Istanbul on 15 June 2000. She was interred at Aşiyan Asri Cemetery following a memorial ceremony at the Istanbul headquarters of ÖDP, where the anthem of the international socialism The Internationale was played, a marching through the entire İstiklal Avenue was performed, and the religious funeral at Teşvikiye Mosque attended by renowned authors and artists.

Awards
She was honored with the "Golden Book Award" in 1993. For her work Virginia Woolf, she received the "Sedat Simavi Literature Award" in 1995, and the "Association of People of Letters Honor Award" in 1996.

Works
She translated the following books into Turkish:
Herman Melville: Moby Dick
Thomas More: Utopia (co-translated with  Vedat Günyol, Sabahattin Eyuboğlu)
Thomas Malory: Arthur'un Ölümü ("Death of Arthur")
Henry Fielding: Tom Jones
Graham Greene: Meselenin Kalbi ("The Heart of the Matter")
Aldous Huxley: Ses Sese Karşı ("Point Counter Point")
William Golding: Sineklerin Tanrısı ("Lord of the Flies")
Clive Bell: Uygarlık ("Civilization") (co translated with Melih Cevdet Anday and Vedat Günyol)

The following are her own books. (Mostly biography):

Macbeth (1965)
Shakespeare ve Hamlet ("Shakespeare and Hamlet") (1984)
İngiliz Edebiyatı Tarihi ("History of English Literature") (5 volumes, 1986–1993)
Virginia Woolf (1995)
D. H. Lawrence (1997)
Edebiyatta Ütopya kavramı ve Thomas More ("Concept of utopia in literature and Thomas More")
Bir Dinazorun Anıları ("Memoirs of a Dinosaur", autobiography) (1998)
Bir Dinazorun Gezileri ("Travels of a Dinosaur", autobiography) )1999)

References

Writers from Istanbul
Politicians from Istanbul
Lycée Notre Dame de Sion Istanbul alumni
Robert College alumni
Istanbul University alumni
Academic staff of Istanbul University
Turkish former Muslims
Turkish atheists
Turkish translators
Turkish women academics
Turkish women writers
Turkish autobiographers
20th-century Turkish women politicians
Turkish socialists
1916 births
2000 deaths
Burials at Aşiyan Asri Cemetery
20th-century translators
Women autobiographers